The CLR James Journal is an annual peer-reviewed academic journal that publishes articles, reviews, and discussions relevant to the work and legacy of C. L. R. James. It was established in 1990 and the editor-in-chief is Paget Henry (Brown University). The journal is sponsored by the Caribbean Philosophical Association and published by the Philosophy Documentation Center.

Abstracting and indexing 
The journal is abstracted and indexed in EBSCO Summon, Philosophy Research Index, PhilPapers, and ProQuest Summon.

See also 
 List of philosophy journals

References

External links 
 

Annual journals
English-language journals
Publications established in 1990
Philosophy journals
Philosophy Documentation Center academic journals